Riddlesdown is a place in the London Borough of Croydon, one mile east from the centre of its post town of Purley. The name applies  to the residential district and to the green space maintained by the City of London Corporation which is also known as Riddlesdown Common.

History
There is evidence of human activity in the area going back at least to neolithic times. Neolithic tools such as scrapes and flakes, and Bronze Age celts have been discovered there. The "Riddle" part of the name is thought to come from the Middle English ridde leah, meaning "cleared woodland". The name has been referred to variously over time as Ridelesdowne (1331), Redele (1338), North Ridle (1422), Riddleys, North Riddeley (1461) and Riddles Down (1765).

Local facilities

The Riddlesdown Lawn Tennis Club was opened by Fred Perry in June 1938. The club has 3 all weather tennis courts which were resurfaced in 2013. It is located on Lower Barn Road.

Most of the housing stock dates from the 1930s and was developed by John Laing plc. The design of some of the houses was influenced by the Art Deco style.

Riddlesdown Collegiate is a local authority secondary school in the area.

Riddlesdown railway station is located on Lower Barn Road with Southern Rail services to London Victoria and London Bridge. Close to the station on Lower Barn Road is also a local post office, hairdressing salon and pharmacy.

Nearest places
Purley
Kenley
Sanderstead

Transport links 
Riddlesdown railway station
 The London Buses route 412, which runs between Purley, town centre and West Croydon Bus Station

External links 
Riddlesdown Residents' Association
 Sanderstead Parish Online - Church of England Parish for Sanderstead, Riddlesdown and Hamsey Green
 Riddlesdown Collegiate

References

Districts of the London Borough of Croydon
Areas of London